Vai Trabalhar, Vagabundo! is a 1973 Brazilian film directed and starring by Hugo Carvana.

Cast 
Hugo Carvana - Secundino Meireles
Odete Lara - Heloísa
Paulo César Peréio - Russo
Nelson Xavier - Babalu
Rose Lacreta - Vitória
Roberto Maya - Azambuja

Awards 
Gramado Film Festival
Best Pictures

Taormina International Film Festival
Best First Film	
Golden Charybdis (Hugo Carvana) (Nominee)

Instituto Nacional de Cinema	
Coruja de Ouro Award

References

External links 
Vai Trabalhar, Vagabundo! on IMDb

Brazilian comedy films
1973 films
1970s Portuguese-language films